Cybele is an ancient goddess of fertility.  Cybele may also refer to:

People
 Cybele (actress), stage name of Greek actress Cybele Andrianou (1887–1978)
 Cybele Druma, rugby player and women's sports activist in Papua New Guinea
 Cybele Kirk (1870–1957), New Zealand temperance and welfare worker, suffragist and teacher
 Cybele Rowe (born 1963), Australian ceramic artist
 C. Cybele Raver, American developmental psychologist
 Cybèle Varela (born 1943), Brazilian artist

Arts and entertainment
 Cybele (sculpture), a statue by Auguste Rodin 
 Cybele (comics), a Marvel Comics character
 , a lolicon dōjinshi by the manga artist Hideo Azuma
 Cybele Records, a German record label founded in 1994
 Cibele (video game), a 2015 video game

Naval vessels
 French frigate Cybèle (1790), a frigate which served in the Napoleonic Wars
 Cybele-class mine destructor vessel, a Second World War Royal Navy class of trimarans
 
 , a general stores issue ship that served in World War II

Science
 Cybele (trilobite), a genus of trilobite
 Cybele asteroids, a group of asteroids in the main belt
 65 Cybele, an asteroid

See also
 Plaza de Cibeles, a famous square and fountain in Madrid, Spain, named for the goddess
 Fountain of Cybele (Madrid) (Fuente de Cibeles or La Cibeles), the fountain in center of the square
 Cybele Palace (Palacio de Cibeles), a building complex located on a side of the square
 Cibell or Cebell, a musical composition named for the goddess
 Cibelle, Brazilian visual artist and musician Cibelle Cavalli Bastos (born 1978)
 Cibel, name of Anarto–SVK, a Belgian cycling team, in 2014 and 2015

Feminine given names